The qualifying competitions for the 2015 CONCACAF U-17 Championship were handled by two regional of CONCACAF's bodies; the Caribbean Football Union (Caribbean zone) and the Central American Football Union (Central American zone).

Representative teams from Canada, Mexico and the United States automatically qualified for the final competition.

Caribbean zone

The Caribbean qualification competition (2014 CFU Men's U-17 Tournament) was organised by the Caribbean Football Union (CFU).

All match times are UTC−4, except Group 1 which are UTC−5.

Teams
A total of 20 teams entered the competition.

First round
The group winners and the two best runners-up advanced to the final round.

Group 1

Group 2

Group 3

Group 4

Group 5

Ranking of runners-up
Since Group 5 contains three teams, only the results against the first and third placed teams are counted. The Dominican Republic were given the tie-breaker over Suriname and would play in the final round of qualifying.

Final round
The final round was hosted in Haiti.

The CFU released a new fixtures list. Guadeloupe were given the spot assumed to be given to Suriname or The Dominican Republic. The dates of the matches were changed from late September to October 19–26. The top two from each group and the best third placed team advanced to the 2015 CONCACAF U-17 Championship.

Group A

Group B

Third place playoff

Final

Awards
Golden Boot
 Nicholas Nelson
MVP
 Alex Marshall
Golden Glove
 Emmanuel Chery
Fair Play Award

Source:

Central American zone

The Central American qualification competition was organised by the Central American Football Union (UNCAF). Honduras, host of the 2015 CONCACAF U-17 Championship, did not participate in the qualifying tournament. The remaining six UNCAF teams were drawn on 19 May 2014 into two triangulars, which were hosted in Costa Rica and Panama, respectively. The first-place teams from each triangular qualified for the 2015 CONCACAF U-17 Championship, while the second-place teams contested a repechage playoff for the final UNCAF berth.

All match times are UTC−6, except Triangular 2 which are UTC−5.

Triangular 1

Triangular 2

Repechage playoff
The two triangular runners-up played a two-legged repechage playoff to determine the last qualifier. The draw for the order of legs was held on 25 November 2014.

|}

Guatemala won 2–1 on aggregate and qualified for the 2015 CONCACAF U-17 Championship.

Qualified teams

North American zone
 (automatic)
 (automatic)
 (automatic)

Central American zone
 (hosts)

Caribbean zone

References

External links
Under 17s – Men, CONCACAF.com
Fútbol Masculino Sub-17, UNCAFut.com 
Men's U17, CFUfootball.org
First round results
Final round results

2015 CONCACAF U-17 Championship
U-17 Championship qualifying
CONCACAF U-17 Championship qualification